Nicholas Chalmers is an English conductor.

Education
Chalmers read music at Oxford University and studied conducting at Conservatorio di Musica di Piacenza.

Career
In 2004 Chalmers co-founded Second Movement, as joint Artistic Director with Oliver Mears. He was Assistant Chorus Master at English National Opera from 2008-2011. For Northern Ireland Opera he has conducted productions of Tosca, The Turn of the Screw and Noye's Fludde. In 2012 he was appointed Artistic Director of the newly formed Nevill Holt Opera, for whom he conducted The Magic Flute in the summer of 2013.

References

English conductors (music)
British male conductors (music)
Living people
21st-century British conductors (music)
21st-century British male musicians
Year of birth missing (living people)